The ANAPROF Clausura 2008 season (officially "Torneo Clausura 2008") started on July 25, 2008. On November 30, 2008 the Clausura 2008 finalized with Árabe Unido crowned four time ANAPROF champion after beating Tauro F.C. 3-2 after extra time. Therefore Árabe Unido will participate in the 2009–10 CONCACAF Champions League.
Plaza Amador remained in the ANAPROF after beating Primera A 2008 champion Río Abajo F.C. with a 3-2 aggregate score. Therefore no team was relegated from ANAPROF for the second consecutive year.

Teams

[*] From round 11

Standings

Results table

Final round

Semifinals 1st Leg

Semifinals 2nd Leg

Tauro advances to final 4-2 on penalties

Final

Árabe Unido qualified for 2009–10 CONCACAF Champions League.

Top goalscorers

Goalscorers by team

Relegation table

Relegation playoff

Plaza Amador remain in ANAPROF''

1st Leg

2nd Leg

Local derby statistics

El Super Clasico Nacional - Tauro v Plaza Amador

Clasico del Pueblo - Plaza Amador v Chorillo

Clasico Interiorano - Atlético Chiriquí v Atlético Veragüense

ANAPROF seasons
1
Pan